This is a list of films which placed number-one at the weekend box office in Argentina during 2017. Amounts are in American dollars.

Highest-grossing films

References

Argentina
2017